The Chinatown neighborhood in Oakland, California（), is traditionally Chinese which reflects Oakland's diverse Chinese American, and more broadly Asian American community. It is frequently referred to as "Oakland Chinatown" in order to distinguish it from nearby San Francisco's Chinatown. It lies at an elevation of 39 feet (12 m).

Chinese were the first Asians to arrive in Oakland in the 1850s, followed by Japanese in the 1890s, Koreans in the 1900s, and Filipinos in the 1930s and 1940s. Southeast Asians began arriving in the 1970s during the Vietnam War. Many Asian languages and dialects can be heard in Chinatown due to its diverse population.

Chinatown is located in downtown Oakland, with its center at 8th Street and Webster Street. Its northern edge is 12th Street, and its southern edge is Interstate 880 (located approximately at 6th Street). It stretches from Broadway on the west to the southern tip of Lake Merritt in the east.

History
Oakland Chinatown dates back to the arrival of Chinese immigrants in the 1850s, making it one of the oldest Chinatowns in North America. By 1860, the census of Oakland included 96 "Asiatics" among a total of 1,543 (6.2% of the city's population). More Chinese arrived to help build the Central Pacific Railroad western portion of the First transcontinental railroad during the Coolie slave trade during the 1860s.

The Chinese settled in shrimp camps on the estuary of Oakland at 1st Street and Castro in the 1850s, near the Point in West Oakland which was referred to as "Chinese Point", and at 4th and Clay streets. The Chinese settlement at Telegraph between 16th and 17th streets burnt down in 1867 and was relocated at the San Pablo Avenue Chinatown between 19th and 20th streets; it is now known as Oakland's Old Uptown Chinatown. Other areas settled were 14th Street between Washington and Clay, and the Charter line (22nd Street) between Castro and Brush Streets.

Fears of the Yellow Peril and local exclusion laws forced the Chinese population to resettle to its current location centered at 8th Street and Webster Street in the 1870s.

The first Chinese in Oakland fished in the San Francisco Bay for shrimp similarly to the Chinese at China Camp near San Rafael. In 1868, Chinese laborers built the Temescal Dam in Oakland providing water for the East Bay as well as the Lake Chabot Dam in 1874–75. They worked in canneries, cotton mills and fuse and explosive factories as well as farms. In the 1880s, discriminatory laws made it difficult for Chinese immigrants to own land or even find work. They found work as laundry workers, cooks, gardeners, houseboys, or as vegetable peddlers. The Chinese Exclusion Act severely limited the further immigration of Chinese. By 1900, the Chinese in Oakland numbered less than 1,000.

The 1906 San Francisco earthquake and fire destroyed most of San Francisco's Chinatown and more than 4,000 Chinese survivors found refuge in Oakland. Even while San Francisco Chinatown was rebuilding, many stayed in Oakland, bringing the Chinatown population to about 2,500. Because of immigration restrictions barring Chinese women and children, a bachelor society was created.

In the 1920s, Oakland Chinatown grew from 10th Street to the waterfront from Broadway to Harrison.

Even until 1940, the Chinatown population grew only to about 3,000. With the United States involvement in World War II and the fact that China was an ally, the Chinese Exclusion Act was repealed in 1943, however the immigration quota was maintained at 105 immigrants per year.

In 1950, Chinatown grew to a population of 5,500, but local housing was lost due to the construction of Interstate 880, which runs through 8 blocks between 5th and 6th streets and serves as a transportation artery for some of Chinatown's commercial activity, Laney College (8 blocks) and later in the late 1960s, the Bay Area Rapid Transit headquarters and Lake Merritt station (2 blocks) and Oakland Museum of California (4 blocks).

Oakland Chinatown was economically stagnant for many years, especially after multigenerational Chinatown residents began moving to the suburbs in the late 1960s. However, Chinatown saw much steady development during the 1980s and 1990s as Chinese American merchants relocated from San Francisco to Oakland, and due to increased immigration from mainland China, Hong Kong, Vietnam, Cambodia, and Thailand. During this time period, many ethnic Chinese Vietnamese and Chinese Cambodians began opening new small businesses, essentially replacing many of the older Taishanese-dominated businesses. Also, investors with Hong Kong backgrounds constructed the Pacific Renaissance Plaza in the early 1990s. Chinatown still retains the traditional aspects and characteristics of an older Chinatown. Oakland's Chinatown also includes a historic and still thriving fortune cookie factory.

Although it is overshadowed by its more prominent, tourist-oriented counterpart in San Francisco, Oakland's Chinatown is bustling with activity and considered to be more authentic to many. Other Asian cultures are represented in Oakland's Chinatown as it has also been settled by non-Chinese Asians such as ethnic Vietnamese (many of whom operate many of Chinatown's jewelry businesses), Koreans, and Thais making it more of a pan-Asian area as opposed to a "Chinatown."  As is the case with other retail and commercial districts around Oakland, the many customers and thriving businesses in Chinatown generate sales tax revenue for Oakland city and Redevelopment Agency coffers.

Japanese immigrants began settling in Oakland in the 1890s mostly in West Oakland around Market Street. Later, hundreds were living in the section between Harrison and Oak streets south of 8th Street. They owned several stores in Chinatown. After the attack on Pearl Harbor in 1941, all Japanese Americans were sent to internment camps. The Masuda family had posted a large "I Am An American" sign outside their Oakland grocery store, Wanto Company, at 8th and Franklin streets which was photographed by Dorothea Lange. Many did not return to Oakland after the war ended. The Buddhist Church of Oakland is one of the few institutions remaining of Oakland's Japantown.

Filipinos immigrated to the area in the early 1900s. Oakland Chinatown was the center of commerce and community gathering for Filipinos in the East Bay during 1940–1960.

People and culture
The residents of Oakland Chinatown include Chinese, Vietnamese, Korean, Filipino, Japanese, Cambodian, Laotian, Mien, Thai, Samoan and others. Consequently, many languages and dialects can be heard, including Cantonese, Chiu-Chow, Ilocano, Japanese, Khmer, Khmu, Korean, Lao, Malay, Mandarin, Mien, Tagalog, Taiwanese, Thai, Toishan, and Vietnamese.

The Oakland Asian Cultural Center offers cultural programs including performances, workshops, festivals, school tours, classes, and exhibitions.

Annual cultural events and fairs

Chinese New Year (also known as Lunar New Year or Vietnamese Tết).
Dragon boat races are held annually at Jack London Square or Treasure Island, California
The Oakland Chinatown StreetFest has been held on the 4th weekend of August annually since 1988.
Mid-Autumn Festival (also known as Moon Festival or Vietnamese Tết Trung Thu).

Chinese Community United Methodist Church

The Chinese Community United Methodist Church (CCUMC), which was initially the Chinese Methodist Church was founded in 1887. The church was established as part of a chain of Methodist Chinese Missions by the Rev. Dr. Otis Gibson. The two primary missions of this ministry was schools and refuge for women escaping slavery and prostitution. This church has close connections with the Women's Missionary Society of the Pacific Coast in San Francisco. In the early days, the Chinese Methodist Church held worship service and Sunday School. Then to serve the needs of the growing Chinese community, an English school for immigrants, and a Chinese school for the American-born Chinese also operated. The early days of the church was sustained by courageous workers, both Chinese- and American-born as there were strong anti-Chinese sentiments in California at this time.

The church was located at several sites in Oakland Chinatown. Chan Hon Fun was the pastor from 1900 to 1909 and established the church's current location in 1905 at 321 8th Street Oakland, CA 94607.  In 1913, a fire devastated the building and a new building was erected. But by the 1940s, the church outgrew even this building. Under the leadership of Rev Edwar Lee, a new church and the current main sanctuary was built in 1952. With more growth, more space was needed, and a new social hall and classrooms annex was built in 1970.

Today, the Chinese Community United Methodist Church conducts both a Chinese (Cantonese and Mandarin) language worship service and English worship service on Sundays.

Notable Landmarks 

 Bill Louie's Corner - 8th and Franklin

Performing arts

Chinese opera was one of the first traditional Chinese art forms in Oakland. In 1907, a Chinese Theater at 9th and Franklin streets opened which could seat 500 people and had a company of 30 full-time actors from China. Today, three styles of Chinese opera clubs are active in Oakland: Cantonese opera, Beijing opera, and Kunqu.

Pacific Renaissance Plaza

A mixed use complex built by Hong Kong investors in the 1990s, this plaza with a central fountain with seating is often viewed as the center of Oakland Chinatown.  The first and second floors are mixed retail/office/civic spaces; it consists of many restaurants, jewelry store, banks, ice creamery, and other retail and health services as well as the Asian Branch Library and Oakland Asian Cultural Center. There are also residential condos/rentals on three sides of the plaza above the second floor: a 13 story residential building on the west side and two 4 story buildings on the south and east side.  Underneath is a 3 level parking lot.

Libraries

The Asian Branch Library is one of many of Oakland Public Library's branches and is located in Chinatown's "Pacific Renaissance Plaza." The Asian Library is unique among public library branches in the United States as it houses eight Asian languages (Chinese, Japanese, Korean, Vietnamese, Thai, Cambodian, Tagalog and Laotian) in major reference titles and general subject titles, an Asian Studies collection, in addition to an English-language Asian American collection.

The Asian Community Library was founded in 1975 as part of a Federal Library Services Construction Act grant to create a model library serving the Asian community in Oakland with multilingual staff and collections. It shared space with the Park Boulevard Branch at 1934 Park Blvd which was 1.5 miles from Chinatown.  To improve access to Asian patrons it operated the Asian Bookmobile in Chinatown and Berkeley. In 1978, it moved to the Main Library about 0.5 miles from Chinatown. In 1981, it moved to a storefront among Chinatown shops and food stores in the 15 story City Center Plaza condos building at 449 9th Street at Broadway becoming the Asian Branch Library. The current location in the Pacific Renaissance Plaza opened in 1995.

Notable natives and residents
Amy Tan, author
Ben Fong-Torres, journalist, author, radio personality
Bruce Lee, martial artist, actor
Dong Kingman (1911–2000), watercolorist, created paintings for Flower Drum Song and The World of Suzie Wong
Dr. Charles Goodall Lee (1881–1973), dentist, first licensed Chinese dentist who financed the lodge building of the Chinese American Citizens Alliance in Oakland
Frank Chin, writer
Fred Korematsu resisted, and then challenged in court, the forced internment of Japanese Americans during World War II (See Korematsu v. United States for more information.)
Lew Hing (1858–1934), tycoon, founded successful cannery building an empire in banking, shipping, and real estate
March Fong Eu, politician
Matt Fong, politician
Maxine Hong Kingston, writer of The Woman Warrior and China Men
Joe Shoong, founder of the National Dollar Stores and philanthropist
Derrick Soo, homeless advocate; 2022 Oakland mayoral candidate
Rodney Yee, yoga instructor
Wendy Yoshimura, watercolor artist
William Wong, journalist and author

Geography

Chinatown is located in Downtown between Broadway to the west, Interstate 880 to the south, Oak Street and Laney College to the east, and 12th Street to the north. The entrance to the Webster Tube, which carries traffic underneath the estuary, is on the edge of Chinatown. Unlike many Chinatowns, it has no formal arch (Paifang) or gate, but it does have bilingual street signs.

The neighborhood can be roughly divided into two distinct areas: Between Broadway and Harrison Street is the commercial area, with busy streets lined with markets, restaurants, banks, and other businesses.  East of Harrison Street, the neighborhood is more residential in character with more apartments and condominiums, less crowded sidewalks, and a mix of retail stores that are more service and product oriented, with fewer groceries and restaurants.  Though the mainstay of commercial activity is south of 10th Street, there are nonetheless many retail shops, stores, and restaurants north of 10th Street and in other parts of Downtown Oakland which are owned by Chinese and Korean merchants.  In particular at the edge of Chinatown, 14th street between Webster and Harrison is block which features numerous Korean restaurants and businesses, especially on the north side of the block.

Recent immigrants have also moved south into "New Oakland Chinatown" in the San Antonio neighborhood along International Boulevard (formerly East 14th Street) and Eastlake business district on East 18th Street.

Government

Representatives
 United States Senate represented by Dianne Feinstein and Alex Padilla
 United States House of Representatives District 13 represented by Barbara Lee
 California State Assembly District 18 represented by Mia Bonta
 California State Senate District 9 represented by Nancy Skinner
 Alameda County District 3 (Fruitvale, San Antonio, Chinatown portions of Oakland, San Leandro, Alameda, San Lorenzo, Ashland, Hillcrest Knolls) represented by Wilma Chan
 Oakland City Council District 2 (Grand Lake-Chinatown) represented by Nikki Fortunato Bas.
Oakland Mayor Libby Schaaf.

Police and fire
The Oakland Police Department's Administration Building is located at 455 Seventh St.

Chinatown is in Oakland Police Department's Beat 3X. The Community Services Section hosts the Asian Advisory Committee on Crime and the Asian Youth Services Committee.

The Chinatown Neighborhood Crime Prevention Council for beat 3x, a neighborhood community-policing board meets monthly.  Meetings are conducted in Cantonese and are open to all.

Oakland Fire Department, Fire Station No. 12 is located at 822 Alice Street at 9th Street. Fire Engine 12 is assigned to this fire station.  The citizens of Oakland and the Oakland Fire Department will remember the service and sacrifice of Oakland Engine Company No. 12. Hoseman Tracy Toomey who died in the line of duty on January 10, 1999 in a 2-story building collapse after responding to a 6-alarm fire on upper Broadway.

Infrastructure

Transportation

Located at the crossroads of the 880 freeway, the tubes linking Alameda and Oakland, and downtown, Oakland Chinatown bears a significant transportation burden that dates back to the 1950s.  Weekday and everyday commerce in the area creates thousands of peak period private automobile trips daily and resulting air pollution impacts on the neighborhood's elderly residents.  Over 20,000 shoppers and tourists use its sidewalks every weekend.  The traffic on I-880 is over 100,000 cars per day.  The neighborhood is served by a freeway on-ramp to I-880 south at 5th and Oak Street.  It is also served by a freeway on-ramp to I-980 at 6th and Jackson.  Recently Oakland's Public Works Agency reconfigured travel lanes on Jackson Street to separate traffic travelling South on Jackson from traffic merging-into Jackson from Eastbound 7th Street.  This effectively eliminated, through lane re-marking, any possibility of the lost art of the "alternating merge."  The volume of automobile traffic travelling away from the core of Chinatown on 7th street towards the freeway connections was so voluminous and unrelenting, that accidents were occurring.

Chinatown has the highest number of automobile-pedestrian collisions in the City of Oakland. A pedestrian safety campaign brought in the first scramble system in Alameda County to Oakland Chinatown to prevent further pedestrian fatalities and injuries.

Until recently, California Auto Insurance company actuarial models charged higher rates to residents in the Chinatown's zip code under a practice known as territorial rating, or zip code profiling.  The insurance actuarial theory behind this market practice purports that drivers residing or "principally garaging" their cars in a certain area face a greater loss and accident ratio.  This practice was outlawed by California voters in 1988 by Proposition 103 on the statewide ballot.  The law made its way through the courts for 18 years before several insurance companies settled with California Insurance Commissioner John Garamendi in 2006 to put an end to the practice.

Oakland is served by several AC Transit bus lines which run on 7th, 8th, 11th, 12th, Broadway, and Franklin Streets.  Many visitors to the neighborhood use nearby mass transit connections.  The neighborhood has two BART stations: 12th Street Station on its northwest corner, and Lake Merritt Station at its eastern edge.

Education

Primary and secondary schools

Public schools

Residents of Chinatown are zoned to schools in the Oakland Unified School District.
Zoned schools include :
Lincoln Elementary School (K-5)
Westlake Middle School
Oakland Technical High School

American Indian Public Charter School II, a charter school campus of the American Indian Model Schools system, is located in Chinatown. It caters to students living in the Chinatown and Lake Merritt areas. In 2008 it shared a campus with Oakland Charter Academies (now Amethod Public Schools).

The Lighthouse Community Charter School was established in Oakland's Chinatown in the 2004 – 2005 school year with grades K-2 and 6–8 and later expanded to serve grades K – 12. In the 2009–2010 school year, the school relocated to a facility close to the Oakland airport.

Yu Ming Charter School, a Mandarin immersion charter school, currently serves grades K through 4. It will eventually grow to K through 8 by adding a grade every year. Formerly located at 321 10th Street, the school moved to 1086 Alcatraz Avenue in February 2013.

Colleges and universities
Laney College is a community college located at the south end of Chinatown. Course offerings include Asian and Asian American Studies, Chinese language, Japanese language, and Chinese Opera (Music Department). It is a part of the Peralta Community College District.
Cal State East Bay has the Oakland Professional Development and Conference Center at Broadway and 11th Street. Continuing education courses includes a certificate program in Teaching Chinese as a Heritage or Other Language.

Other education services

The Mun Fu Yuen "Chinese school" has after school and weekend classes in Cantonese and Mandarin to promote the Chinese language and culture at the Shoong Family Chinese Cultural Center on 9th Street at Harrison.  The Center was established in 1953 by philanthropist Joe Shoong with the support of the Oakland Chinese community.  It is the original and longest established Chinese school in Oakland with graduates that have contributed much towards the welfare of our Oakland community.

Healthcare Services and Options
A source of healthcare for the surrounding community include Asian Health Services. Since 1974, they  have provided the densely populated Asian community with health services including mental health, dental care, advocacy and opportunities to participate in community leadership. "To serve and advocate for the medically underserved, including the immigrant and refugee Asian community...", is an integral part of their mission statement

See also

History of Chinese Americans in San Francisco
Jack London Square
Lakeside Apartments District
List of ethnic enclaves in North American cities
Oakland City Center
Old Oakland

References

Books
 Bagwell, Beth (1994). Oakland, the Story of a City.
 Collins, Willie R. (Ed.) (1994). Chinese traditional arts and folklore in Oakland. City of Oakland Cultural Arts Division's Traditional Arts Program.
 Ma, Eve Armentrout and Ma, Jeong Huei (1982). The Chinese of Oakland: Unsung Builders Oakland Chinese History Research Committee.
 National Park Service History. A History of Chinese Americans in California. Retrieved June 7, 2005.
 Wa Sung Community Service Club. Oakland Chinatown Community Directory 2005.
 Wong, William (2004). Oakland's Chinatown (Images of America: California). Arcadia Publishing  AsianWeek review San Francisco Chronicle review
Fong Torres, Ben (1994). The Rice Room: Growing up Chinese-American—From Number Two Son to Rock 'n' Roll.

Websites

Shoong Family Chinese Cultural Center: Chinatown, Oakland

Further reading
 Ah-Tye, Howard (1999). Resourceful Chinese. Matai Group.
 Chann, Ernest (1976). "Brief History of Oakland Chinatown." Unpublished monograph. At Oakland Public Library, Oakland History Room.
 Chow, Willard T. (June 1, 1977). The Reemergence of an Inner City: The Pivot of Chinese Settlement in the East Bay Region of the San Francisco Bay Area. R & E Pub. 
 Ma, L. Eva Armentrout (January 1, 2001). Hometown Chinatown: A History of Oakland's Chinese Community, 1852–1995. (Asian Americans). Garland Publishing. 
 Wong, William (2001). "Yellow Journalist: Dispatches from Asian America." Temple University Press.

External links
 Oakland Chinatown History overview, personal histories, and photos
 Oakland Chinatown Chamber of Commerce
Taste More Than China In Oakland's Chinatown SF Chronicle August 9, 2000
Oakland Chinatown Enjoying Renaissance AsianWeek Sept 2, 1999
Reclaimed Stories: Chinatown, Oakland Project press release
Chinese in California, 1850–1920 Library of Congress' American Memory website
Oakland Asian Cultural Center
Oakland Chinatown Oral History Project – inter-generational oral history project to collect and preserve the ongoing narrative of community life in Oakland Chinatown

Asian-American culture in Oakland, California
Neighborhoods in Oakland, California
Oakland
Chinese-American culture in California
Chinatowns in California